Igwuruta is a town in Rivers State, Nigeria.

Towns in Rivers State